= Smilezone Foundation =

Canadian charity

The Smilezone Foundation is a Canadian charity created in 2012 to improve the lives of children facing illness, disabilities, physical, and emotional obstacles. The foundation creates spaces in hospitals to allow children a place to play and experience a reprieve from being in a hospital. As of 2019, the foundation counted 250 smilezones across the country.

The Smilezone describes its mission as "to create, build and transform areas in hospitals, private treatment and development centres, and children’s clinics in order to improve the lives of children facing illness, disabilities, and physical and emotional obstacles."
